Anovec is a settlement in the hills northeast of Krško in eastern Slovenia. The area is part of the traditional region of Lower Carniola. It is now included with the rest of the Municipality of Krško in the Lower Sava Statistical Region.

References

External links
Anovec on Geopedia

Populated places in the Municipality of Krško